The IND World's Fair Line, officially the World's Fair Railroad, was a temporary branch of the Independent Subway System (IND) serving the 1939 New York World's Fair in Queens, New York City. It split from the IND Queens Boulevard Line at an existing flying junction east of Forest Hills–71st Avenue station, ran through the Jamaica Yard and then ran northeast and north through Flushing Meadows–Corona Park, roughly along the current path of the Van Wyck Expressway. The line continued along a wooden trestle to the World's Fair Railroad Station, located slightly south of Horace Harding Boulevard (now the Long Island Expressway). The World's Fair station, the only one on the line, consisted of two tracks and three platforms.

The line was planned beginning in 1936, and it was constructed in 1938. The line and station were only open in 1939 and 1940 during the Fair's operating season. Passengers had to pay a ten-cent fare to use this line, double the subway's standard five-cent fare. This was not the only line to serve the world's fair. The Interborough Rapid Transit and the Brooklyn Manhattan Transit operated service to the Fair via the World's Fair station of their joint-operated IRT Flushing Line. The World's Fair Railroad and station are the only IND line and station to have been closed and demolished. Remnants of the line are still present in the Jamaica Yard.

History

In 1935, New York City Parks Commissioner Robert Moses selected the then-new Flushing Meadows–Corona Park in central Queens for what would become the 1939 New York World's Fair. In December 1936, the Board of Transportation and the New York State Transit Commission sent a request to the New York City Board of Estimate in order to have adequate rapid transit facilities to handle World's Fair crowds when the fair opened in 1939. An extension of the city-operated Independent Subway System (IND) to the World's Fair was part of this plan. It was facilitated by the extension of the Queens Boulevard Line to Union Turnpike and the nearby Jamaica storage yard, all of which had opened at the end of December 1936. It was originally expected that the World's Fair spur would cost about $1.2 million, of which $700,000 was allocated on construction and $500,000 was allocated for equipment. However, it ended up costing $1.7 million. For legal and financial reasons, the line was called the "World's Fair Railroad" and was considered a separate entity from the IND. Part of this designation included the state legislation approving the "double-fare" for the line (see ).

The Board of Transportation awarded the contract for the IND World's Fair Line on October 26, 1937, to the P. T. Cox Contracting Company. The company had been the lowest bidder for the contract, having offered to construct the trestle for the World's Fair Line at a cost of $308,770. The World's Fair extension was opposed by Parks Commissioner Moses, who believed the new subway spur would be "extravagant and wasteful".

During the line's planning stages in 1937, the Board of Estimate considered making the line a permanent connection to Flushing Meadows Park following the end of the fair. They also looked at the possibility of intermediate stations along the line to serve the local areas, comprising what is now Kew Gardens Hills and Flushing. The upgrades to make the line permanent would have cost around $6 million. However, it was determined to be impractical due to the absence of permanent attractions in the park at the time; these attractions, such as the Citi Field baseball park and the USTA National Tennis Center, were not added until later.

In early 1938, construction on the IND World's Fair Line began. It originated at the Queens Boulevard portal of Jamaica Yard as a continuation of the tracks that diverged from the Queens Boulevard Line east of 71st−Continental Avenues. The line consisted of two tracks ending in a stub-end terminal called World's Fair Station. The marshy swampland in the line's right-of-way was filled in, and a trestle was built over the landfill. The line was designed to be removed following the fair in 1940.

Test trains on the IND World's Fair Line were run beginning on April 22, 1939, and the line opened on April 30, 1939. The  local train mostly serviced the line, running between Smith–Ninth Streets and the World's Fair Station. Additional  express service ran between World's Fair Station and Hudson Terminal during afternoon rush hours and evenings. Passengers on the E or F trains who were not going to the Fair would transfer at Continental Avenue. Service generally ran until 1:30am.

The 1939 World's Fair had two seasons: one each in 1939 and 1940, which ended in the fall months of the year. Service for the first season ended on November 1, 1939, and during this season the line's ridership was 7,066,966. The IND World's Fair Line was closed between seasons, and at the end of the Fair the line was set to be demolished. The last train ran on October 28, 1940, the day after the closure of the Fair. While most of the fairgrounds were torn down soon after the event, the line remained intact for several months afterward. Queens borough president George U. Harvey proposed extending the line to serve the then-developing neighborhoods of Flushing, College Point, and Whitestone, along with the recently opened Queens College. This plan was supported by the local communities, elected officials in Queens, and the president of Queens College. It was deemed to be unfeasible, however, by the Board of Transportation due to the fact that the trestle was constructed to be temporary, and due to regulations at the time which required permanent lines for subway service to be built underground. Parks and highway commissioner Robert Moses, meanwhile, wished to utilize the right-of-way for the further development of Flushing Meadows Park and the extension of the Van Wyck Expressway towards the Whitestone Expressway and the Whitestone Bridge. Demolition of the line was authorized in December 1940, and on January 15, 1941, removal of the line commenced. The right-of-way was replaced with an extension of 136th Street, and eventually the northern portion of the Van Wyck Expressway which formed today's Interstate 678. Seven train signals that were modified for the World's Fair Line still exist along the Jamaica Yard's track connections to the Queens Boulevard Line. Instead of controlling the speeds of passenger trains, these signals are now used to control the speeds of yard traffic.

Preparation for the 1964 World's Fair started in 1960. An extension of the IND Queens Boulevard Line to the fair grounds was considered. Robert Moses, who was going to take over as president of the World's Fair on May 15, 1960, rejected the proposal once he found out that the line would have cost $10 million. In the end, improved Flushing Line service, and increased E, F, and GG service on the Queens Boulevard Line would provide improved transportation facilities for the fair.

Station

The World's Fair station was the line's northern terminus and its sole station, located in the Amusement Area of the World's Fair. The station was a temporary stub-end terminal with two tracks and three platforms, organized in a Spanish solution. A third siding was built south of the station. The stop was alternately named the Horace Harding Boulevard station, after the avenue where it was located. It was open for only nineteen months, from April 30, 1939, to October 28, 1940.

To enter the station, an additional 5-cent fare was charged on top of the standard nickel fare. Eighteen special turnstiles were used at the World's Fair station that permitted traffic flow in both directions and accepted two different fares depending on the direction of travel. Fairgoers disembarking from trains paid a nickel as they exited through the turnstiles while passengers entering the station from the fairgrounds paid a ten-cent fare upon passing through the turnstiles. The double-fare was instituted to avoid a financial deficit. The stations on the IND Rockaway Line, opened in 1956, would later employ this fare system until 1975.

Competing IRT and BMT service
The Interborough Rapid Transit Company (IRT) and Brooklyn–Manhattan Transit Corporation (BMT) also served the World's Fair, but did so directly with World's Fair (now Mets–Willets Point) station on the dual-operated Flushing Line, which was rebuilt into an express station for the Fair. A Long Island Rail Road station, the current Mets–Willets Point station, was built next to the Flushing Line station.

Notes

References

External links
1939 Rapid Transit Map of Greater New York
O Gauge Railroading Forum - Vestiges of World's Fair spur

World's Fair
1939 New York World's Fair
World's Fair